The Battle of Hořice (German name: Horschitz) was fought on April 27, 1423, between the Orebites faction of the Hussites and Bohemian Catholics. The Hussites were led by Jan Žižka (who was completely blind at the time of the battle), while the Catholics were led by the repeatedly-converting Čeněk of Wartenberg. The battle took place on the Gothard plateau, near Hořice. Thanks to a strategic position, which allowed perfect use of Hussite war wagons and Žižka's tactical skills, the Hussites eventually won the battle.

Hussites took the high ground and built their Wagenburg (wagon fort) there. The Catholic cavalry could not ride up such a steep hill and was forced to dismount. The cannons owned by the nobles could not fire effectively uphill. These circumstances made it a battle between infantry behind fortifications and heavily armored infantry in the field. Žižka's men held the Wagenburg against repeated attacks by dismounted cavalry. Then, Žižka decided that the time was right to counterattack. With some cavalry, the Hussites charged downhill and swept catholic forces from the battlefield.

References 

 The Battles of the Hussite Wars
 "The Hussite Wars (1419-36)", Stephen Turnbull, Osprey Publishing

Horic
1423 in Europe
Conflicts in 1423
Hořice
Jan Žižka
History of the Hradec Králové Region